Gustaf "Gösta" Richard Mikael Holmér (23 September 1891 – 22 April 1983) was a Swedish athlete who competed in the 1912 and 1920 Olympics. In 1912 he won a bronze medal in the decathlon and placed eighth in the pentathlon, despite not running the 1500 m stage. In 1920, he placed fourth in the decathlon and was eliminated in the first round of the 110 m hurdles event. Nationally Holmér won Swedish titles in the pentathlon (1912–13, 1915, 1917 and 1920), decathlon (1913 and 1917–19) and 110 m hurdles (1913).

In the 1912 Olympic decathlon Holmér finished fourth, but was awarded a bronze medal after the winner Jim Thorpe was disqualified for having played semi-professional baseball. Thorpe was reinstated as a winner in 1982, and Holmér was moved down to the fourth place, yet he retained a bronze medal.

In the 1930s, while coaching the downtrodden Swedish cross-country team, Holmér developed the fartlek interval training technique. His concept was faster-than-race-pace and concentrated on simultaneous speed/endurance training. The technique proved successful and has been adopted by many physiologists since then.

Holmér was the father of Hans Holmér, who headed the special unit investigating the assassination of the Swedish Prime Minister Olof Palme in 1986.

References

1891 births
1983 deaths
Athletes (track and field) at the 1912 Summer Olympics
Athletes (track and field) at the 1920 Summer Olympics
Swedish decathletes
Olympic athletes of Sweden
Olympic bronze medalists for Sweden
Medalists at the 1912 Summer Olympics
Olympic bronze medalists in athletics (track and field)
Olympic decathletes